A list of American films released in 1992.

Unforgiven won the Academy Award for Best Picture.

Highest-grossing
 Aladdin
 The Bodyguard
 Home Alone 2: Lost in New York
 Wayne's World
 Lethal Weapon 3
 Batman Returns
 A Few Good Men
 Sister Act
 Bram Stoker's Dracula
 Basic Instinct

#–A–B

C–E

F–H

I–L

M–N

O–P

Q–R

S

T

U–Z

See also
 1992 in American television
 1992 in the United States

External links

 
 List of 1992 box office number-one films in the United States

1992
Films
Lists of 1992 films by country or language